Note: Not to be confused with the Mikoyan-Gurevich MiG-23, which was a completely different aircraft, though designed to fulfil the same specification.

The Mikoyan-Gurevich 23-01, aka Izdeliye 92 and (erroneously)  Mikoyan-Gurevich MiG-23PD, NATO reporting name Faithless, was a 1960s STOL fighter / attack aircraft, designed in the USSR, to fulfil a requirement for ground-attack and fighter aircraft able to operate from short runways.

Specifications (23-01)

References

23-01
1950s Soviet fighter aircraft
Delta-wing aircraft
Mid-wing aircraft
Aircraft first flown in 1967
STOL aircraft